The Gourdou-Leseurre GL-820 HY family of four-seat single-engined floatplanes were designed and built in France during the latter half of the 1930s by Gourdou-Leseurre. The GL-820 HY and GL-821 HY 02 were shipborne reconnaissance / observation aircraft, while the sole GL-821 HY was built as a torpedo carrier.

Design and development
The Gl-820 and GL-821 were low-wing monoplane floatplanes with four tandem open cockpits, (the Cockpits on the GL-821 HY 02 were enclosed). The wings, tailplanes and floats were all supported by a system of streamlined struts.

Variants
GL-820 HYThe initial reconnaissance aircraft prototype, powered by a  Hispano-Suiza 9Vb driving a two-bladed fixed-pitch wooden propeller.
GL-821 HYThe second aircraft built as a torpedo carrier, powered by a  Gnome & Rhône 9Kfr.
GL-821 HY 02The third aircraft, powered by a  Gnome & Rhône 9Kfr driving a three-bladed metal propeller.

Specifications (GL-821 HY)

References

1930s French military reconnaissance aircraft
GL-820